Yuriy Trambovetskiy (born June 27, 1987) is a Russian athlete.

Achievements

References

1987 births
Living people
Russian male sprinters
21st-century Russian people